2022 UAF Regions' Cup (Kubok rehioniv UAF) was the third season of the Ukrainian Association of Football renewed competition at regional level. The competition was conducted among football teams of Oblasts (regions) composed of players who compete at oblast championships (regional competitions).

The winner of the competition would represent Ukraine at the 2023 UEFA Regions' Cup.

Competition schedule

Preliminaries

Quarterfinals

Semifinals

Final

Bracket

References

External links

UAF Regions' Cup
UAF Regions' Cup
UAF Regions' Cup